Palm Trees and Power Lines is a 2022 American coming-of-age drama film directed by Jamie Dack in her feature directorial debut, based on her 2018 short film of the same name. The screenplay by Dack and Audrey Findlay is from a story by Dack. The film stars Lily McInerny as a disconnected teenage girl falling into a relationship with a man twice her age. It also stars Jonathan Tucker and Gretchen Mol.

The film had its world premiere at the 38th Sundance Film Festival on January 24, 2022, where Dack won the U.S Dramatic Competition Directing Award. It was released in limited theaters and on VOD on March 3, 2023, by Momentum Pictures. The film received positive reviews from critics and earned four nominations at the 38th Independent Spirit Awards, including Best First Feature.

Plot
Lea is a 17-year-old girl spending the last few weeks of her summer hanging out with her best friend Amber. She lives in suburban Southern California with her single mother, the emotionally absent Sandra. Lea's father is not present in her life and lives in Arizona with his new family. Lea and Amber hang out with boys their age, and Lea has a casual relationship with one of them, Jared. However, Jared only values Lea for sex and their hookups are not satisfying for her. 

One night, as the group of friends eat at a diner, Lea makes eye contact with an older guy sitting at another table, who winks at her on his way out. Lea’s friends run out on the bill, but Lea is left behind because she hesitates to follow them. When she does try running out, a cook accosts her, but the same man from earlier intervenes and Lea is able to get away. As she walks home, the older man drives his car alongside her and coaxes her into getting in. The guy introduces himself as Tom and tells Lea he is 34 years old, while Lea shares her age. Before she gets out of the car, he adds his mobile number onto her cell phone. 

Lea is charmed by Tom and confides to Amber that she has met someone, but doesn’t disclose the details and says the guy is a boy at another school. Lea’s relationship with her mom becomes further strained when she welcomes an ex-boyfriend back to their house. Lea turns to Tom for attention and validation, and he acts sympathetically to her problems, telling her he too does not have a close relationship with his father. When Lea asks Tom what he does for a living, he vaguely says he has his own business doing home repairs and remodeling. 

Lea soon enters into a romantic relationship with Tom. When she agrees to spend the night with him, he takes her to a motel, reasoning he is temporarily staying there until he finds a new place. Lea senses something is wrong when Tom must leave the room to deal with something, but he insists to her that he was just helping out one of his neighbors. On a day out with Tom at the beach, Lea is spotted by a friend at school, and Tom introduces himself to her. Word gets back to Amber, and Lea makes her promise not to tell anyone about their relationship. Tom also asks Lea not to see other guys, telling her, "You're mine." 

Lea and Tom are at a restaurant one day and the waitress suspects Lea is in a coercive relationship. When Tom steps outside to take a phone call, the waitress covertly tells Lea that if she needs to get away, she can help her. Confused and unaware that she is being groomed by Tom, Lea asks why she would need help, and the waitress mentions that Tom frequents the eatery with other young girls. When Tom returns, he can sense Lea’s unease and gets her to talk about what’s troubling her. When she confesses the waitress said she’s seen him before with other girls, he plays it off and claims she must have him mistaken with someone else.

Later, while Lea is out drinking and smoking with friends, Jared mockingly jokes she has been seen "hanging out with the geriatric." Lea, angry that Amber is the one who told Jared, storms off and shows up distraught at Tom's motel room. Tom reassures her that her friends and family’s opinions don’t matter. He also gifts her a bracelet inscribed with an inside joke they share. When he asks if she wants to go somewhere with him, Lea agrees without hesitation and the two head to a hotel. On their second night at the hotel, Tom sits Lea down and asks her if she can do something for him. He says she needs to sleep with another man for money, and if she loves him she’ll do it for him. Having coerced her into prostitution, he leaves her with a middle-aged man. The unnamed man coaxes a reluctant Lea into oral and anal sex. While the man is in the shower, an emotional Lea packs her things and leaves the room, but Tom catches her in an embrace before she can leave the hotel. 

He takes her to get food at a restaurant, and Lea uses an excuse to go to the restroom as an opportunity to leave him, walking to a nearby gas station by herself. She tearfully calls Amber to come pick her up, and when she arrives the two reconcile. At home, Lea makes an effort to spend more time with her mother and returns to her usual activities with Amber. Amber compliments Lea’s bracelet, which compels her to try and phone Tom, but his mobile numbers are disconnected. She goes to the motel and knocks on his door, but it goes unanswered. She inquires about Tom's whereabouts from a neighboring woman, whom she had seen before speaking with him, and the woman reluctantly dials his number and puts her through to Tom. Lea sobs into the phone and asks why Tom abandoned her. The film ends with her affirmation of her feelings for him.

Cast

Release
The film premiered at the Sundance Film Festival on January 24, 2022, where it won the U.S. directing award. It also screened at the San Francisco International Film Festival, the Melbourne International Film Festival, the Deauville Film Festival, the Filmfest Hamburg, the London Film Festival, the Busan International Film Festival, the São Paulo International Film Festival, the Valladolid International Film Festival, the Thessaloniki International Film Festival, the Tallinn Black Nights Film Festival, the Stockholm International Film Festival and the Torino Film Festival.

In November 2022, Momentum Pictures acquired US and UK distribution rights to Palm Trees and Power Lines, with a limited theatrical and VOD release on March 3, 2023.

Reception

Critical response
On the review aggregation website Rotten Tomatoes, the film holds an approval rating of 90% based on 70 reviews, with an average score of 7.7/10. The website's critics consensus reads, "Palm Trees and Power Lines tells a difficult story with searing skill – and marks Lily McInerny as a young actor with brilliant potential". On Metacritic, which uses a weighted average, the film has a score of 73 out of 100 based on 20 critic reviews, indicating "generally favorable reviews".

K. Austin Collins of Rolling Stone commented "This is a movie operating on the principle that the most routine form of this violence isn’t sensational, but subtle." Writing for RogerEbert.com, Brian Tallerico called the film "a character study that’s anchored by a moving breakthrough performance from Lily McInerny, and one that ably supports and balances it from Jonathan Tucker." Tomris Laffly of Harper's Bazaar wrote the film "goes somewhere even darker than Andrea Arnolds Fish Tank, with a brave query into the notion of consent and a gut-wrenching parting note that feels like a scream stuck in one's throat."

Roxana Hadadi of Vulture wrote, "Tucker’s performance here is so mesmerizingly disquieting", and he uses "the ability to temper the predatory glint in his eye with soft-spoken sensitivity" to "tremendously unsettling effect". Hadadi added the film "doesn't deviate from where you predict it will go", but concluded "the relationship McInerny and Tucker build is so convincing in its mixture of exploitation and yearning that Palm Trees and Power Lines capably secures what Lea desires most too: your attention."

While some critics said the film felt "frustratingly underdeveloped", Richard Brody of The New Yorker conceded, "the revelation of [Tom's true intent], when it arrives, is a shock nonetheless, to Lea and to viewers...[becoming] clear in a powerful, agonizing scene that Dack films with a supreme inspiration of empathy and understanding distilled into a single, fixed-frame, five-minute-plus shot, during which the anguish of anticipation yields to terror and revulsion."

Accolades

References

External links
 
 

2022 films
2022 drama films
2022 independent films
2020s American films
2020s coming-of-age drama films
2020s English-language films
American coming-of-age drama films
American independent films
Features based on short films
Films about sexual abuse
Sundance Film Festival award winners
English-language drama films